Early growth response protein 2 is a protein that in humans is encoded by the EGR2 gene.  EGR2 (also termed Krox20) is a transcription regulatory factor, containing three zinc finger DNA-binding sites, and is highly expressed in a population of migrating neural crest cells. It is later expressed in the neural crest derived cells of the cranial ganglion. The protein encoded by Krox20 contains two cys2his2-type zinc fingers. Krox20 gene expression is restricted to the early hindbrain development. It is evolutionarily conserved in vertebrates, humans, mice, chicks, and zebra fish. In addition, the amino acid sequence and most aspects of the embryonic gene pattern is conserved among vertebrates, further implicating its role in hindbrain development. When the Krox20 is deleted in mice, the protein coding ability of the Krox20 gene (including the DNA-binding domain of the zinc finger) is diminished. These mice are unable to survive after birth and exhibit major hindbrain defects. These defects include but are not limited to defects in formation of cranial sensory ganglia, partial fusion of the trigeminal nerve (V) with the facial (VII) and auditory (VII) nerves, the proximal nerve roots coming off of these ganglia were disorganized and intertwined among one another as they entered the brainstem, and there was fusion of the glossopharyngeal (IX) nerve complex.

Function 

The early growth response protein 2 is a transcription factor with three tandem C2H2-type zinc fingers.  Mutations in this gene are associated with the autosomal dominant Charcot-Marie-Tooth disease, type 1D, Dejerine–Sottas disease, and Congenital Hypomyelinating Neuropathy. Two studies have linked EGR2 expression to proliferation of osteoprogenitors  and cell lines derived from Ewing sarcoma, which is a highly aggressive bone-associated cancer.

New research suggests that Krox20 - or the lack of it - is the reason for male baldness.

References

Further reading

External links 
  GeneReviews/NCBI/NIH/UW entry on Charcot-Marie-Tooth Neuropathy Type 1
  GeneReviews/NCBI/NIH/UW entry on Charcot-Marie-Tooth Neuropathy Type 4
 

Transcription factors